Scribbler may refer to:

Scribbler (card shop), a British chain of greetings card shops
Scribbler (robot)
Scribbler (racehorse) a competitor who failed to complete the 1997 Grand National steeplechase
An employee in a scribbling mill where the wool was roughly carded before spinning - Old English occupation.
The Scribbler, see List of defunct newspapers of Quebec
The Scribbler (album)
The Scribbler (film), 2014 American thriller film directed by John Suits
The Scribbler (graphic novel) by Daniel Schaffer
Scribbler or Cladara atroliturata, a moth found in North America